Davydkovo is a village in Novorzhevsky District of Pskov Oblast, Russia.

Rural localities in Pskov Oblast